Basmanda is a village in Sughd Region, northern Tajikistan. It is part of the jamoat Vahdat in Devashtich District. With a population of nearly 8000, it is one of the largest villages of the district. Basmanda is situated in the foothills of the Turkestan Range.

References

Populated places in Sughd Region